Bulut Sedat Alpman (born 1990), better known by his stage name Rota, is a Turkish rapper and songwriter.

Discography

Studio albums
 Senkronik (2014)
 Pert (2020)

Singles
  STABİL (2013)
 Şeytanla Sözleşme (2018)
 Uyumsuz (2018)
 Orta Parmağımın İçinde(2018)
 Hayal Kuramayan (2018)
 Bende Bir Şeyler Öldü (2018)
 1826 Gün (2018)
 Negro (2018)
 Sorunlu (2018)
 Semt (2019)
 Öldürmen Gerek (2019)
 Peşimde (2019)
 Ağla (2020)
 İblisler (2020)
 Ölüme Beş Kala (2020)
 Zirve (ft. Canbay & Wolker, Cato, Velet, Defkhan) (2020)
 Nedir Bü (2020)
 Buna Değmem (2020)
 Casio (2020)
 Bu yaşta (2020)
 Islak (2020)
  I IH  (2020)
 Cıss (2020)
 Darmadağın (2020)
 Diren (2020)
 İstemem (2020)
 Boşluk (2020)
 Bir Yalan Söyle Bana (2020)
  DAR (2020)
  Uyuyamıyorum (2021)
  RUH (ft. Defkhan) (2021)
  Yara (ft. lalfizu) (2021)
 Geberiyorum (2021)
 Sen Gidince (2021)
 Öpüştüm Ölümle (2021)
 Silüet (2021)
 Harap (2021)
 X-ray (2021)

References

External links

Living people
1990 births
Turkish rappers
Turkish hip hop
Turkish lyricists
Turkish male singers
Singers from Istanbul